Shampoo is a 1975 American comedy film directed by Hal Ashby, and starring Warren Beatty, Julie Christie, Goldie Hawn, Lee Grant, Jack Warden, Tony Bill, and Carrie Fisher in her film debut. Co-written by Beatty and Robert Towne, the film follows a promiscuous Los Angeles hairdresser on Election Day 1968, as he juggles his relationships with several women. The film is a satire focusing on the theme of sexual politics and late-1960s sexual and social mores.

Plot

On the eve of the 1968 United States presidential election, successful Beverly Hills hairdresser George Roundy meets with Felicia, one of his several clients/sexual partners, at his apartment. During sex, he receives a phone call from Jill, his naive, younger, up-and-coming actress girlfriend, who is suffering a panic attack, paranoid that an intruder is in her home. George rushes from his house to calm Jill, which frustrates Felicia.

George's occupation and charisma have provided him the perfect platform from which to meet and have sex with beautiful women, including his current girlfriend. Despite this, 34-year-old George is dissatisfied with his professional life; he is the creative star of the salon in which he works, but has to play second fiddle to Norman, the "nickel-and-diming" mediocre hairdresser who owns the business.

George dreams of setting up his own salon business, but cannot convince any bank to lend him the capital he needs. He seeks out Felicia and her unsuspecting husband Lester to bankroll him. George's meeting with Lester supplies a second secret for him to keep from his would-be benefactor; Lester's current mistress, Jackie, is George's former girlfriend, perhaps the most serious relationship he has ever had. Jackie is also best friends with Jill, making the situation even more complicated. 

Jackie arranges for George to style her hair, which he fashions nearly identically to Felicia's. Sexual tension arises between the two, and George attempts to kiss Jackie. At first, Jackie rebuffs George, but then kisses him back. They are about to have sex in the bathroom when they hear Lester announce his arrival. As Lester comes into the room, they pretend for his benefit that George is finishing styling Jackie's hair.

Lester, who assumes George is gay because of his profession, asks George to escort Jackie to a Republican Party election-night soiree. Upon arriving, George finds himself in the same room as a number of present and former sexual partners, including Jill (who came with Johnny Pope, a film director considering her for a role in his next film) and Felicia. Jackie becomes upset, drinks too much, and behaves outrageously, so Lester asks George to take her home, but she refuses to go. 

All the principals except Felicia adjourn to a posh counterculture party at a Beverly Hills mansion, where guests indulge in alcohol, other drugs, and sexual pursuits. Lester, followed moments later by Jill and Johnny, happen upon a couple having vigorous sex in the dark on the kitchen floor. Lester comments admiringly on this tryst to Jill and Johnny, who look on through the window in stunned silence. Suddenly, the refrigerator door George had failed to properly close comes open, illuminating Jackie and him. Lester, shocked, abruptly leaves. An enraged Jill throws a chair, breaking the window, and swears at George. Jackie flees as George tries to placate Jill with an obvious lie, but Jill, unmollified, runs off to spend the night with Johnny.

The following morning Jill confronts George at her home with one of Felicia's earrings, which she found in his bed. When she asks about his dalliances, George admits he sought a career in the beauty industry as a means to pursue beautiful women, and that his promiscuity, while making him feel like he will live forever, may mean he does not love her. Upon returning to his home, George is met by Lester and some intimidating men. George and Lester soon find mutual understanding. Lester calls Jackie a whore and mentions he is fed up with her. Lester promises George a business deal and he and the men leave. 

George subsequently goes to Jackie's house, but she worriedly flees in her car, claiming she does not want Lester to find them together. George pursues her on his motorcycle, and the two arrive on a hilltop overlook above her house. George proposes to Jackie, but she tells him it is too late; she has arranged to go to Acapulco with Lester, who has said he will divorce Felicia and marry her. Jackie leaves George alone on the overlook, from where he sadly watches her depart with Lester.

Cast

Analysis
Film scholar Emanuel Levy describes Shampoo as a critique of suburbia, comparing its self-contained Beverly Hills setting to the small towns depicted in films such as Jaws and The Stepford Wives (both also released in 1975). He elaborates on the film's political themes:

Soundtrack
The soundtrack includes songs from its setting of the late 1960s. Included in the party sequence are the Beatles ("Sgt. Pepper's Lonely Hearts Club Band" and "Lucy in the Sky with Diamonds"), Buffalo Springfield ("Mr. Soul"), Jefferson Airplane ("Plastic Fantastic Lover" and "Good Shepherd"), and Jimi Hendrix ("Manic Depression"). Also included on the soundtrack album is "Wouldn't It Be Nice" by the Beach Boys, which plays over the opening and closing credits of the film.

Release

Shampoo premiered in New York City on February 11, 1975.

Reception

Upon its release, the film generally received positive reviews from critics who lauded its talented cast and sharp, satirical writing. Praise was not universal; some critics, including Roger Ebert, pronounced it a disappointment. 

Commercially, Shampoo was a great success. Produced on a budget of $4 million, the film grossed $49,407,734 domestically and $60 million at the worldwide box office. It earned an estimated $23.9 million in North American rentals, making it the third-highest-grossing film of 1975, beaten only by Jaws and One Flew Over the Cuckoo's Nest.

Accolades

Legacy
From reviews compiled retrospectively, review aggregation website Rotten Tomatoes gives the film a score of 65% based on 37 reviews, with an average score of 6.6/10. The site's consensus reads: "Shampoo trains a darkly comic lens on post-Nixon America, aiming at—and often hitting—an array of timely targets". The film is recognized by American Film Institute in these lists:
 2000: AFI's 100 Years...100 Laughs – #47

Sony Pictures Home Entertainment released Shampoo on DVD in January 2003. On October 16, 2018, The Criterion Collection re-released the film on Blu-ray and DVD in a special edition, featuring a new 4K scan of the original film elements.

Shampoo also served as the inspiration for the 1976 exploitation film Black Shampoo, directed by Greydon Clark, which is an example of the common blaxploitation filmmaking technique of intentionally piggybacking on the titles of hit films starring predominantly white casts to provide predominantly African American "alternatives" to the earlier films; Clark explained in an interview that his reason for making a blaxploitation film about a black male hairdresser's sexual trysts patterned after Ashby's film was that Clark did not want to make a film about a pimp, private detective or drug dealer, who were often the protagonists of blaxploitation films.

See also
 List of American films of 1975

References
Notes

Bibliography

External links
 
 
 
 
"Shampoo: First as Farce", an essay by Frank Rich at the Criterion Collection

1975 films
1975 comedy-drama films
1975 romantic drama films
1970s romantic comedy-drama films
1970s satirical films
1970s sex comedy films
American romantic comedy-drama films
American satirical films
American sex comedy films
1970s English-language films
Films about elections
Films about hairdressers
Films directed by Hal Ashby
Films featuring a Best Supporting Actress Academy Award-winning performance
Films produced by Warren Beatty
Films set in California
Films set in Los Angeles
Films set in 1968
Films set in the 1960s
Films shot in California
Films shot in Los Angeles
Films with screenplays by Robert Towne
Films with screenplays by Warren Beatty
1970s American films